is the pen name for a Japanese writer who is the leading member for the group 07th Expansion. He is the creator of the When They Cry visual novel series, which includes Higurashi When They Cry, Umineko When They Cry and Ciconia When They Cry. His pen name is originated from Final Fantasy, "Ryūkishi" being the term for "Dragoon" and "07" a play on words for "Lenna".

Career
Ryukishi07 studied at a vocational school that specializes in art and wrote doujinshi, while having interests on anime, manga and video games. While in college, he tried to write manga and novels, but realized, "No matter your passion for something, without skill, you can never make it as a professional." He met with a colleague from a theatre troupe and he was inspired to write a play called , which he submitted to a contest that he later lost. His younger brother, Yatazakura, inspired by the success of Type-Moon's visual novel Tsukihime, suggested that he and Ryukishi create their own sound novel. Ryukishi restructured Hinamizawa Bus Stop into the episodic visual novel series, Higurashi When They Cry. After graduating from school, he dreamed of becoming a video game developer. He focused on finding a job at a video game manufacturer, but he failed to do so. He took up a position at a menswear store, but after a few months, he tentatively took up an offer for a civil service position based on the civil service test that he had taken during the job search.

Reactions to worldwide spread of his works
In a 2012 interview with Damien Bandrac for the Journal du Japon, Ryukishi07 said: Initially, my audience was otaku who attend Comiket, which are a very small fraction of Japanese otaku, themselves a small part of Japanese people in general! I never thought for one second that I could be read, published, edited at the other end of the planet, in France... As for Higurashi, I never thought that people outside Japan might be interested. Umineko in particular is a text that even Japanese people can have difficulty reading. So, to imagine that foreigners have made the effort to read it, understand it, and translate it, is an indescribable happiness to me.

His writing has been described as alternating between "macabre scenes and schoolboy humor". He has said, "A story should be like a roller coaster. That is to say before writing a really cruel scene, I have to lift the people's spirits, for example, with a fun scene... Before writing a scene of pure despair, we must go through scenes of hope. And indeed, when I write, all of this amuses me very much." He has cited And Then There Were None as his influence.

Works
Higurashi When They Cry (screenplay and illustrations, Kodansha Box novels)
, novel, serialized in Faust
Higurashi Daybreak (screenplay)
Umineko When They Cry (screenplay and illustrations, Kodansha Box novels)
Rewrite by Key (partial screenplay)
Ōkami Kakushi by Konami (original plan/director)
Higanbana no Saku Yoru ni
, a 3D game collaboration with Twilight Frontier
Rose Guns Days (screenplay and partial character design)
Iwaihime (Scenario)
Hotarubi no Tomoru Koro ni (Story)
Trianthology: Sanmenkyō no Kuni no Alice (partial screenplay and partial illustrations)
Renai Harem Game Shuuryou no Oshirase ga Kuru Koro ni (story)
Ciconia When They Cry
Gensō Rōgoku no Kaleidoscope (story)
Loopers by Key (story)
Silent Hill f by Konami (story)

References

External links
07th Expansion's official website 

 
1973 births
Japanese fantasy writers
Japanese horror writers
Japanese mystery writers
Japanese science fiction writers
Japanese video game designers
Living people
People from Chiba Prefecture